Kuka muu muka is the eighth studio album by Finnish rapper Cheek. On 31 October 2014, the album was rereleased as Kuka muu muka – Stadion Edition, a CD/DVD/Blu-ray combo with three extra songs.

Singles

Both songs peaked at number one on the Finnish Singles Chart. Upon the release, Kuka muu muka spawned seven more songs to appear on the chart, making Cheek the first artist ever to occupy nine positions on the chart in a single week. One of those songs, "Parempi mies", was also released as a promotional single in October 2013.

Track listing

Standard version

Charts and certifications

Charts
Kuka muu muka

Kuka muu muka – Stadion Edition

Certifications

Release history

See also
List of number-one albums of 2013 (Finland)

References

2013 albums
Cheek (rapper) albums
Finnish-language albums